WGNN is a Christian radio station licensed to Fisher, Illinois, broadcasting on 102.5 MHz FM.  WGNN serves East-Central Illinois, including the Champaign-Urbana area.  WGNN is also heard on locally in Champaign and Urbana on 103.9 FM through translator W280DE, and is heard locally in Clinton, Illinois on 97.1 through translator W246BD.  The station is owned by Good News Radio, Inc.

Translators

References

External links
WGNN's official website

GNN
Champaign County, Illinois
Radio stations established in 1996
1996 establishments in Illinois